Rana amurensis (Khabarovsk frog, Siberian wood frog, Heilongjiang brown frog or Amur brown frog) is a species of true frog found in northern Asia. It ranges across western Siberia, as well as northeastern China, northeastern Mongolia, and on the northern Korean Peninsula and on Sakhalin. Rana coreana was previously included in this species as a subspecies. Found at latitudes up to 71° N, it is the northernmost wild amphibian species.

According to the IUCN, the chief threat to the species is habitat loss, as it is only mildly tolerant of disturbance. In addition, it has become a frequent subject of hunting in Russia since the 1990s. It is not considered threatened on a global scale though.

Favoring lowlands, it is seldom encountered at elevations of more than 600 m. A habitat generalist, Rana amurensis favors open ground, but is also found in both deciduous and coniferous forests. In the winter, it hibernates on pond bottoms.

Rana amurensis favors beetles, and consumes  of food per day. The average lifespan is three years. Their breeding season is very early, starting in late February in Korea. An egg sac contains 30-60 eggs.

References

External links

Rana (genus)
Amphibians described in 1886
Amphibians of China
Amphibians of Korea
Amphibians of Mongolia
Amphibians of Russia
Fauna of Siberia